Pat O'Connor may refer to:

Sportspeople
Pat O'Connor (Australian footballer, born 1881) (1881–1956), Australian rules footballer for St Kilda
Pat O'Connor (Scottish footballer) (fl. 1958–1967), Kilmarnock FC player
Pat O'Connor (wrestler) (1924–1990), wrestler from New Zealand
Pat O'Connor (hurler) (born 1965), Irish retired hurler
Pat O'Connor (referee), Irish hurling referee
Pat O'Connor (rugby union) (born 1985), former Australian rugby union player for the Western Force and Waratahs
Pat O'Connor (racing driver) (1928–1958), American racecar driver
Pat O'Connor (boxer) (born 1950), former professional light heavyweight boxer
Pat O'Connor (American football) (born 1995), American football player

Others
Pat O'Connor (director) (born 1943), Irish film director of Sweet November
Pat O'Connor (politician) (born 1960), American politician in Missouri

See also
Pat O'Conner (born 1958), baseball executive and 11th president of Minor League Baseball
Patrick O'Connor (disambiguation)
Patricia O'Connor (disambiguation)